Paul Francis "Pope" Pyers (13 March 1935 – 12 June 2016) was an Australian rugby league player in the New South Wales Rugby League (NSWRL) competition.

A halfback, Pyers, played 9 matches with the Eastern Suburbs side in the 1954 season. He is recognized as that club's 421st player. The following year he moved to Queensland where he was a represented the Queensland state team in matches against NSW, New Zealand and Great Britain. In 1960 he returned to the NSWRL where he played 2 seasons for the Parramatta club.

References

External links

Paul Pyers' obituary
Paul Pyers on the Nasho Nominal Roll

1935 births
2016 deaths
Australian rugby league players
Parramatta Eels players
Rugby league players from Sydney
Sydney Roosters players